Karen Li (born September 19, 1977, in Guiping, Guangxi, China) is a table tennis player for New Zealand. At the 2002 Commonwealth Games she won a silver medal partnering her sister Chunli Li in the women's doubles and a bronze medal  in the team event.

References 

Living people
New Zealand female table tennis players
Commonwealth Games silver medallists for New Zealand
Commonwealth Games bronze medallists for New Zealand
People from Guigang
1977 births
Olympic table tennis players of New Zealand
Table tennis players at the 2000 Summer Olympics
Table tennis players at the 2004 Summer Olympics
Commonwealth Games medallists in table tennis
Table tennis players from Guangxi
Naturalised table tennis players
Table tennis players at the 2002 Commonwealth Games
Medallists at the 2002 Commonwealth Games